The 62nd edition of the Vuelta a Andalucía, also known as the Ruta del Sol, was held in Andalusia, in southern Spain, from 17 to 21 February 2016. Spanish rider Alejandro Valverde won the event after winning the final mountain-top stage; his fourth overall victory in the Vuelta a Andalucía.

The Vuelta a Andalucía is a road cycling stage race, rated as a 2.1 event of the 2016 UCI Europe Tour. Chris Froome, the previous year's champion, did not to defend his title. The race was run over five stages. The first three stages were moderately hilly and won by sprinters; the fourth was an individual time trial; the fifth and final stage had a summit finish atop the climb of Peñas Blancas.

Course

Race summary 

The race comprised five stages, increasing in difficulty. The first, relatively flat stage, was won by Daniele Bennati in a sprint in the streets of Seville. The second ended with a third-category climb, followed by a technical descent into Córdoba, won by sprinter Nacer Bouhanni. The third stage featured several climbs, ending with a flat run-in to El Padul, won by Oscar Gatto in the sprint of a select group. The final two stages were decisive in the general classification. The fourth stage, a  individual time trial with a technical opening half and a climb at the finish, was won by Tejay van Garderen. The final stage ended with the climb of Peñas Blancas, a  climb  near Estepona at an average gradient of 8%. Alejandro Valverde, in eight place after the time trial, attacked from afar to overhaul van Garderen and take the overall victory.

Stage schedule

Classifications

Teams 
24 teams were invited to take part in the 2016 race. Ten of these were UCI WorldTeams; ten were UCI Professional Continental teams; and four were UCI Continental teams. Each team lined up seven riders - totaling 168 riders.

References

External links 

 

Vuelta a Andalucia
Vuelta a Andalucia
2016